Broccolini, Aspabroc, or baby broccoli, is a green vegetable similar to broccoli but with smaller florets and longer, thin stalks. It is a hybrid of broccoli and gai lan (which is sometimes referred to as "Chinese kale" or "Chinese broccoli"), both cultivar groups of Brassica oleracea. The name Broccolini is a registered trademark of Mann Packing.

History 
Broccolini was originally developed over eight years by the Sakata Seed Company of Yokohama, Japan as a hybrid of broccoli and Chinese broccoli, rather than being the product of genetic modification. It was developed to create a milder-tasting vegetable which could grow in hotter climates than broccoli, to expand Sakata's broccoli market.

Sakata partnered with Sanbon Incorporated in 1994 to begin growing the product commercially in Mexico under the name Asparation, implying a similarity to asparagus due to its slim, edible stem. After first becoming available in US markets in 1996, in 1998, Sakata began a partnership with Mann Packing Company in Salinas, California and marketed the product as Broccolini. New forms of Broccolini continue to be developed, including purple broccolini.

Description 
Broccolini has a similar structure to sprouting-type broccoli. It is annual or biennial, herbaceous, and glabrous.

Consumption 
The entire vegetable (leaves, young stems, unopened flower shoots, and flowers) is consumable. Its flavor is sweet, with notes of both broccoli and asparagus, although it is not closely related to the latter.

Common cooking methods include sautéing, steaming, boiling, and stir frying. According to a 2005 study assessing how Australians cooked broccolini, the majority used steaming, with less stir-frying, and a small minority ate it raw or in a salad.

Nutrition 
Broccolini is a source of vitamin A, vitamin C and vitamin K, folate and glucosinolates.

Broccolini contains a similar profile of phenolic acids to other vegetables in the Brassica family, most notably containing flavonoids. Research into flavonoids in broccolini leaves has suggested they can inhibit the growth of some cancers. Such research has found that common cooking methods reduce broccolini's phenolic acid content, particularly boiling.

Production

Climate 
Broccolini grows in cool climates and is intolerant of extreme climates. It is more sensitive to cold temperatures than broccoli but less sensitive to hot temperatures.

Growth and distribution
Broccolini takes 50–60 days to grow after being transplanted. It is harvested when the heads are fully developed but are not flowering. By cutting off the head, the harvest time is extended as new side shoots of smaller heads will grow.  Unlike other cruciferous vegetables, which are harvested once per growth cycle, broccolini is harvested 3-5 times in a growth cycle, depending on growing conditions. Further unlike broccoli, the stalk is inedible, rather, the side shoots are harvested and consumed.

After being harvested, the produce is cooled to 0 °C, preventing the flower heads developing to maintain quality. Shelf life can be further extended with the use of modified atmosphere packaging.

In the US, broccolini is grown in California during Summer and Arizona during Winter.

Produce reference
The International Federation for Produce Standards assigns it the price look-up code 3277, "baby broccoli". It is also known as asparation, asparations, "sweet baby broccoli", broccoletti, and broccolette "Italian Sprouting broccoli". It is sold under the registered trademarks Bimi and Tenderstem.

References

Brassica oleracea
Inflorescence vegetables